In mathematics, a pseudo-monotone operator from a reflexive Banach space into its continuous dual space is one that is, in some sense, almost as well-behaved as a monotone operator. Many problems in the calculus of variations can be expressed using operators that are pseudo-monotone, and pseudo-monotonicity in turn implies the existence of solutions to these problems.

Definition

Let (X, || ||) be a reflexive Banach space. A map T : X → X∗ from X into its continuous dual space X∗ is said to be pseudo-monotone if T is a bounded operator (not necessarily continuous) and if whenever

(i.e. uj converges weakly to u) and

it follows that, for all v ∈ X,

Properties of pseudo-monotone operators

Using a very similar proof to that of the Browder–Minty theorem, one can show the following:

Let (X, || ||) be a real, reflexive Banach space and suppose that T : X → X∗ is bounded, coercive and pseudo-monotone. Then, for each continuous linear functional g ∈ X∗, there exists a solution u ∈ X of the equation T(u) = g.

References

  (Definition 9.56, Theorem 9.57)

Banach spaces
Calculus of variations
Operator theory